The Bug Wars were origami contests among members of the Origami Detectives which started when one member made a bug, a horned beetle with outspread wings, from a single sheet of paper: this design provoked other members to design more complex origami in the shape of bugs, such as wasps and praying mantises.

The Bug Wars motivated computational origamists to build models and algorithms to add complexity in a more systematic manner. The majority of the origamists in the Origami Detectives did not use these novel computational tools in the creation of their own origami art. Since the Bug Wars, there have been a collection of books, instruction guides, academic papers, and origami art that have been inspired by the prolonged event. Each year, the Origami Taneidan Convention in Japan hosts conventions that feature the work of some of the world's most renowned origami artists. Along with the convention, Tanteidan Convention Books are released each year with exclusive folding instructions from different designers. An Oirgami Tanteidan Magazine is released more frequently (6 times a year) and includes diagrams for 3 to 5 models, a crease pattern challenge, and other related articles in each issue. Recent content is published both in English and Japanese.

References

External links
The Origami Lab by Susan Orlean for The New Yorker
Robert Lang's recollection of the Bug Wars

Origami